Euryneura propinqua is a species of soldier flies in the family Stratiomyidae.

Distribution
United States, Colombia, Mexico, Venezuela.

References

Stratiomyidae
Insects described in 1867
Taxa named by Ignaz Rudolph Schiner
Diptera of South America
Diptera of North America